Abu Sahl 'Isa ibn Yahya al-Masihi al-Jurjani was a Christian Persian physician, from Gorgan, east of the Caspian Sea, in Iran.

He was the teacher of Avicenna. He wrote an encyclopedic treatise on medicine of one hundred chapters (al-mā'a fi-l-sanā'a al-tabi'iyyah), which is one of the earliest Arabic works of its kind and may have been in some respects the model of Avicenna's Qanun.

He wrote other treatises on measles, on the plague, on the pulse, etc.

He died in a dust storm in the deserts of Khwarezmia in 1010.

References

Sources
Carl Brockelmann: Arabische Litteratur (vol. 1, 138, 1898).
 G. Karmi, A mediaeval compendium of Arabic medicine: Abu Sahl al-Masihi's "Book of the Hundred.", J. Hist. Arabic Sci. vol. 2(2) 270-90 (1978).

Further reading

See also
List of Iranian scientists

People from Gorgan
10th-century Iranian physicians
Members of the Assyrian Church of the East
Botanists of the medieval Islamic world
Iranian Christians